BNS Karotoa is an  offshore patrol vessel of the Bangladeshi Navy. She entered service with the Bangladeshi Navy in 2003.

History
Built by Hall, Russell & Company, she was modelled on the ocean-going trawlers FPV Jura (1973) and FPV Westra (1974). The vessel was laid down on 11 June 1978 and launched on 27 February 1979. She was commissioned into Royal Navy as HMS Alderney (P278) on 6 October 1979. In 2002 she was sold to the Bangladesh Navy.

Career
Bangladesh acquired the ship on 31 October 2002. On 4 May 2003, BNS Karotoa was commissioned into the Bangladesh Navy.  She is currently serving under the command of the Commodore Commanding BN Khulna (COMKHUL).

See also
List of active ships of the Bangladesh Navy
Image as HMS Alderney

References

Bibliography

Ships of the Bangladesh Navy
Patrol vessels of the Bangladesh Navy
Island-class patrol vessels of the Bangladesh Navy
1979 ships
Ships of the Fishery Protection Squadron of the United Kingdom
Ships built by Hall, Russell & Company